Monument to the revolutionary victory of the people of Slavonia  or Monument to the people-hero of Slavonia is a former World War II memorial sculpture by Vojin Bakić, that was located in, now uninhabited, Serbian village of Kamenska, Brestovac, Slavonia, Croatia. It was destroyed by the Armed Forces of Croatia in 1992.

It was built over a decade, from 1957 to 1968. At the time of its opening it was the largest postmodern sculpture in the world. It was dedicated to the people of Slavonia during World War II and made of stainless steel. The opening ceremony was performed on 9 November 1968 and attended by Yugoslav president Josip Broz Tito.

During the disintegration of Yugoslavia in 1991, the works of Vojin Bakić were on the "list" for monuments to be demolished. In 1992, an unprecedented culturicide occurred when, according to eyewitnesses, the commander of the 123rd Brigade of the Croatian Army, Major Miljenko Crnjac, ordered the demolition of the monument on February 21. The monument was completely demolished only after the ninth attempt to blow it up.

See also

List of Yugoslav World War II monuments and memorials in Croatia

References

External links 

 Spomenik Database - Kamenska Monument educational & historical resource

Buildings and structures completed in 1968
Buildings and structures demolished in 1992
World War II memorials in Croatia
1968 sculptures
Postmodern architecture
Buildings and structures in Požega-Slavonia County
Yugoslav World War II monuments and memorials